Tropical Cyclone Tam (RSMC Nadi designation: 04F, JTWC designation: 06P) was the first named storm of the 2005–06 South Pacific cyclone season. Forming out of a tropical depression on January 6, the storm gradually intensified, becoming a tropical cyclone on January 12 and receiving the name Tam. Although it was traveling at a quick pace, the storm gained organization and reached its peak intensity with winds of  the following day. However, the increasing forward motion of the storm, combined with strengthening wind shear, caused Tam to rapidly weaken on January 14. Around that time, it entered the  Tropical Cyclone Warning Centre in Wellington, New Zealand's area of responsibility. Shortly thereafter, the storm transitioned into an extratropical cyclone and dissipated early the next day. Cyclone Tam produced heavy rainfall and strong winds over American Samoa upon being named. The precipitation caused several mudslides and flooding, which inflicted $26,000 in damage. The storm also had minor effects on Niue, Tonga, and Futuna.

Meteorological history

The system, designated 04F by the Regional Specialized Meteorological Centre (RSMC) in Nadi, Fiji tracked slowly towards the west. Although the depression was located within an area of low wind shear, little intensification occurred, as a lack of low-level moisture hindered the development of deep convection. By January 9, shower and thunderstorm activity associated with the disturbance increased as it began to interact with the South Pacific Convergence Zone. Another tropical depression, 05F, also became increasingly organized and at one point was forecast to absorb 04F. Following the weakening of Tropical Depression 05F, 04F intensified. Around 2000 UTC on January 11, the Joint Typhoon Warning Center (JTWC) issued a Tropical Cyclone Formation Alert as deep convection persisted around the center of circulation for several hours.

The following day, the RSMC Nadi upgraded Tropical Depression 04F to a tropical cyclone and gave it the name Tam, making it the first named storm of the 2005–06 season. By 0000 UTC on January 13, the JTWC classified Tam as Tropical Cyclone 06P. Although the storm was tracking towards an area with stronger winds aloft, it was forecast to intensify. Due to the relatively fast movement of the storm, the increasing winds aloft had little effect on the storm, allowing it to intensify and attain winds of  around 0600 UTC. However, with both wind shear and the forward motion of the storm continuing to increase, convection rapidly became dislocated from the center. Around 0000 UTC on January 14, Tam entered the area of responsibility of the Tropical Cyclone Warning Centre in Wellington, New Zealand. With forward movement estimated at  almost due south, the cyclone reached an unusually high latitude as a tropical cyclone. Coinciding with the time when Tam reached 33°S, it transitioned into an extratropical cyclone. The remnants of the storm persisted for several hours before dissipating early on January 15.

Preparations and impact
As Tam was developing, residents attempted to evacuate the island by plane, with the primary target of Fiji. Only a few flights took off before officials closed the airport, stranding numerous passengers. Late on January 11, RSMC Nadi placed Tonga and Futuna under a tropical cyclone alert and also placed Tonga and Wallis under a strong wind warning. Early the next day RSMC Nadi placed northern Tonga under a tropical cyclone gale warning. Later that morning they canceled the tropical cyclone alert for Wallis and Futuna as Tam was not expected to directly affect Futuna anymore. During that afternoon RSMC Nadi placed Niue under a Tropical cyclone alert, as they predicted that Niue would be affected by Tam within 24 hours. Early on January 13 RSMC Nadi cancelled the tropical cyclone warnings and alerts for Tonga, whilst at the same time placing Niue under a tropical cyclone gale warning, however this gale warning was canceled later that day as Tam moved into the southern ocean.

On January 11, Tropical Depression 04F produced a record  of rain in a 24‑hour span on Rotuma. However, little damage resulted from the heavy precipitation. Cyclone Tam produced heavy rainfall in American Samoa which triggered damaging floods. Several buildings were flooded, and an estimated 70% of the island's crops were destroyed. Scattered power outages were reported throughout the island. A few landslides were also reported as a result of the storm. Damage from the storm totaled $26,000 on the island. Relatively little damage was recorded in Futuna; there, the storm downed several trees and stranded a yacht on a reef. Minor damage, consisting of fallen branches and isolated power outages also occurred on Niue.

See also

2005–06 South Pacific cyclone season
Cyclone Urmil (2006)
Cyclone Cilla

References

External links
 World Meteorological Organization
 Fiji Meteorological Service
 Meteorological Service of New Zealand
 Joint Typhoon Warning Center 

Category 1 South Pacific cyclones
Tam
Tropical cyclones in American Samoa
Tropical cyclones in Tonga
Tropical cyclones in Fiji
Tropical cyclones in Samoa
Tam